Pearse is a surname. Notable people with the name include:

Alfred Pearse (1855–1933), English cartoonist and campaigner
Arthur Sperry Pearse (1877–1956), American botanist and zoologist
Barbara Pearse (born 1948), British biological scientist
Benjamin Pearse (1832–1902), Anglo-Canadian surveyor and administrator
Cecilia, Lady Pearse (1853-1926), British writer
Christopher Pearse Cranch (1813–1892), American writer and artist
George Pearse (disambiguation), several people
Guy Pearse, Australian author and environmentalist
Isabel Pearse (1912–1999), American actress
John Pearse (politician) (c.1760–1836), British politician and Governor of the Bank of England
John Pearse (1939–2008), British guitarist
Mabel Cosgrove Wodehouse Pearse (b.1872), Irish writer
Margaret Pearse (1857–1932), Irish politician, mother of Patrick, Willie and Margaret Mary
Margaret Mary Pearse (1878–1968), Irish politician and teacher, sister of Patrick Pearse
Mark Guy Pearse (1842–1930), English preacher, lecturer and author
Ormerod Pearse (1884–1953), South African cricketer
Patrick Pearse (1879–1916), Irish teacher, barrister, poet, writer, nationalist and political activist, older brother of William Pearse
Richard Pearse (1877–1953), New Zealand inventor
Rupert Pearse, British physician specialising in intensive care medicine
Samuel Pearse (1897–1919), Australian soldier and recipient of the Victoria Cross
Samuel Herbert Pearse (b.1865), Nigerian businessman
Susan Beatrice Pearse (1878–1980), British illustrator
Thomas Deane Pearse (c.1738–1789), British Army officer
Vyvyan Pearse (1891–1956), South African cricketer
Willie Pearse (1881–1916), Irish nationalist, younger brother of Patrick Pearse

See also
Pearce (surname)
Pears (surname)
Pierce (surname)
Peirce (surname)
Pearson (surname)

Surnames from given names